Shuster (originally a spelling variant of Schuster) is the surname of several people:

Bill Shuster, American politician from Pennsylvania
Bud Shuster, American politician, father of Bill
David Shuster, American reporter
Frank Shuster, Canadian comedian
Jared Shuster (born 1998), American baseball player
Joe Shuster, Canadian comic book artist
John Shuster, American curler
Mike Shuster, American journalist
Noam Shuster-Eliassi, Israeli comedian and activist
Rosie Shuster, Canadian comedy writer
Savik Shuster, Ukrainian journalist
Suzy Shuster, reporter
William Howard Shuster, American artist
William Morgan Shuster, American diplomat

Jewish surnames
Occupational surnames